The 2014 Tour of Flanders was the 98th edition of the Tour of Flanders single-day Monument classics. In a four-rider sprint finish, Swiss rider Fabian Cancellara won the race for a record-equalling third time – and for the second year in succession – ahead of Belgian trio Greg Van Avermaet, Sep Vanmarcke and Stijn Vandenbergh.

Route

Teams
As the Tour of Flanders was a UCI World Tour event, all 18 UCI ProTeams were invited automatically and obligated to send a squad. Seven other squads were given wildcard places, thus completing the 25-team peloton.

The 25 teams that competed in the race were:

Results

References

External links

2014 in Belgian sport
Tour of Flanders
2014